The 1996–97 Cincinnati Bearcats men's basketball team represented the University of Cincinnati in NCAA Division I competition in the 1996–97 season. The Bearcats, coached by Bob Huggins, won Conference USA and reached the second round of the 1997 NCAA tournament. The team finished with an overall record of 26–8 (12–2 C-USA) and a No. 10 ranking in the final AP poll.

Roster

Schedule

|-
!colspan=12 style=|Regular Season

|-
!colspan=12 style=|C-USA Tournament 

|-
!colspan=12 style=|NCAA Tournament

Rankings

Awards and honors
Danny Fortson – C-USA Player of the Year, Consensus First-Team All-American

References

Cincinnati
Cincinnati Bearcats men's basketball seasons
Cincinnati
Cincinnati Bearcats men's basketball
Cincinnati Bearcats men's basketball